is a passenger railway station located in the city of Miki, Hyōgo Prefecture, Japan, operated by the private Kobe Electric Railway (Shintetsu).

Lines

Station layout
The station consists of a ground-level side platform and one ground-level island platform connected to the station building by a level crossing. The station is unattended.

Platforms

Adjacent stations

History
Shijimi Station opened on December 28, 1937.

Passenger statistics
In fiscal 2019, the station was used by an average of 1836 passengers daily.

Surrounding area
 Hyogo Prefectural Miki Higashi High School
Jiyugaoka Community Center
Miki Sanyo Hospita

See also
List of railway stations in Japan

References

External links

 Official website (Kobe Electric Railway) 

Railway stations in Japan opened in 1937
Railway stations in Hyōgo Prefecture
Miki, Hyōgo